Nintendo Force, or NF Magazine, is a bi-monthly magazine that centers upon various Nintendo hardware products. In December 2012, IGN editor and magazine founder Lucas M. Thomas announced his intention to release the magazine, stating that he had begun to plan for the magazine upon hearing of Nintendo Power'''s cancellation.  The magazine includes staff members from Destructoid, GoNintendo, IGN, Nintendojo, 1Up.com, and the writer and founder of the online comic Brawl in the Family, and Nintendo World Report, among others.

Its first issue was released January 11, 2013, hosted under HP's MagCloud service with a price of $17.99 for one print/digital issue and $4.99 for just a digital copy. The debut issue had 80 pages, including a review of Fire Emblem: Awakening and a preview of Luigi's Mansion: Dark Moon as its main overview.

 Overview and design NF Magazine was created with the intention of "continuing the legacy" of Nintendo's official Nintendo Power magazine following its cancellation in 2012 after 24 years. It focuses primarily on news, reviews, and previews of the latest Nintendo games, as well as interviews with people in the gaming industry. NF Magazines design is similar to Nintendo Power, including some of the same sections that were a staple in Nintendo Power. The two magazines have many differences, however, both aesthetically and content-wise. Force has a larger section on retro games, and also includes many full-color comics, a feature Nintendo Power used less often in its later issues.

 Main sections 

 Features 

 Inbox 
The Inbox section is where fan art and letters sent to the editors are featured. There are also polls and reader response letters, very similar to Nintendo Powers Pulse section. A column on the second page entitled "Don't Anger the Ox" serves as a throwback to Nintendo Powers "Don't Hassle the Hoff", which spotlights editor David Oxford's response to a single letter. The new section with the Ox is much tamer than the original Hoff section in Nintendo Power. 

 News 
The News section provides information on recently announced Nintendo-related games and products, as well as some of the editors' reactions to the news in the form of their Mii characters' speech bubbles. It contains the same "Collector's Corner" as was featured in Nintendo Power's "Power Up" section, spotlighting video game-related merchandise. It also includes a throwback to Nintendo Powers "A Winner Is.../Dodongo Dislikes..." column in the form of "Yeah!/Unyeah..." (a nod to Nintendo's Miiverse), which highlights brief highs and lows in the gaming industry.

 Download 
The Download section provides information on recently released and upcoming digital releases for games and apps on the Nintendo eShop. In the first issue, there was an interview with Jools Watsham of Renegade Kid. It also contains short reviews of digital games with a recommendation grade. Around their third issue, NF Magazine changed the Recommended/Not Recommend rating system to the score increments used in the Review Section. The highest rated games so far are EarthBound, Super Mario Bros. 2, and The Legend of Zelda: A Link to the Past, each scored a perfect 10.

 Comic Break 
Throughout the magazine, there are two or three comics per issue related to Nintendo games, including one by webcomic Brawl in the Family's artist Matthew Taranto.

 Previews 
The Previews section has information on upcoming games spread throughout pages accompanied by numerous screenshots and artwork.

 Retro 
The Retro section takes a look at older video games in the industry, such as those for the Nintendo Entertainment System and the Super Nintendo Entertainment System. It also features the same "Star Power" column as was featured in Nintendo Powers "Power Up" section, spotlighting a video game character.

 Reviews 
A section where staff writers review the latest games. The games are rated on a scale of 1–10 with increments of .5. The highest rated games so far using this system are The Legend of Zelda: Breath of the Wild, Super Smash Bros. Ultimate, and Super Smash Bros. for Wii U, each with a perfect 10. Currently the only Games with a 9.5 are Luigi's Mansion: Dark Moon, Mario & Luigi: Dream Team, and Donkey Kong Country: Tropical Freeze. The games with a 9.0 are Fire Emblem Awakening, Etrian Odyssey IV: Legends of the Titan and Animal Crossing: New Leaf. Among the worst games are Sonic & All-Stars Racing Transformed for Nintendo 3DS, which got a 4.5, and Wreck-It Ralph for Wii, which got a 3.0.

 Community 
The Community section is dedicated to Nintendo culture, covering Nintendo-related art, cosplay, and websites from fans.

 See also Nintendo PowerNintendo of AmericaIGN''

References

External links
 

2013 establishments in the United States
Magazines established in 2013
Computer magazines published in the United States
Video game magazines published in the United States
Bimonthly magazines published in the United States
Magazines about Nintendo
Nintendo publications